The Sigma 19mm F2.8 EX DN lens is a wide-angle prime lens for Sony E and Micro Four-Thirds mounts, announced by Sigma in January 2012. Along with the Sigma 30mm F2.8 EX DN, it was part of the first release of Sigma lenses for compact interchangeable lens cameras, and hence the inception of the "DN" line, created by Sigma to cater to these cameras, an offering that in January 2013 was expanded with another lens, the Sigma 60mm f/2.8 DN Art.

Exterior
The lens has a matte black plastic exterior.

Optics
The lens suffers from mild barrel distortion, moderate vignetting, and moderate amounts of chromatic aberration.

In general it is a sharp lens especially in the centre and when stopped down to f8 the edges will catch-up.  Flare resistance is quite good. Bokeh is smooth and colour rendition is neutral.

"Art" series version
On January 29, 2013, an aesthetically updated version of this lens was announced, the Sigma 19mm F2.8 DN Art. It has a glossy black (or silver) plastic exterior with the Sigma Art "A" badge on the side of the lens. It features a large manual focus ring and a detachable barrel-type lens hood.

The optics are identical to the older version.

See also
 List of third-party E-mount lenses
 List of Micro Four Thirds lenses

References

19
Camera lenses introduced in 2013
Sigma 19 2.8 EX